The Evangelical Friends Church – Eastern Region (EFCER) is an evangelical denomination of Christians who trace their beginning back to George Fox and the Religious Society of Friends.  Based in Canton, Ohio, it is composed of over 90 churches and church plants, and is part of Evangelical Friends Church International (EFC-I).  Near to the church's administrative offices is the campus of the affiliated Malone University.

History
The Ohio Yearly Meeting of the Friends Church (OYM) was established on October 12, 1812 by the Baltimore Yearly Meeting of the Religious Society of Friends. At the time the Ohio Yearly Meeting included most of the Friends meetings West of the Allegheny Mountains.  The first OYM yearly meeting was on August 14, 1813 at Short Creek, with Horton Howard presiding. The first Yearly Meeting House was erected in 1814 in Mt. Pleasant, Ohio. Many new local “meeting houses” followed.

During the 1800s the Friends movement experienced a separation over theology that would today be characterized as a debate between Unitarian/Universalism and Orthodoxy (Hicksites & Orthodox Meetings).  Later the Society of Friends again wrestled over traditional Friends practices and Evangelicalism (Wilburite and Gurneyite Meetings). These separations resulted in multiple groups using the name "Ohio Yearly Meeting".

In 1917 the evangelicals (Gurneyites) moved their headquarters to Damascus, Ohio and became known as the Ohio Yearly Meeting (Damascus).  The Yearly Meeting House in Damascus was used from 1866 until a few years before it was razed in the 1970s.  Later, they relocated again, this time to Canton, Ohio. In 1965 the Ohio Yearly Meeting (Damascus) joined the Evangelical Friends Alliance. In 1971 Ohio Yearly Meeting (Damascus) became Evangelical Friends Church – Eastern Region (EFCER).

Baptism and communion
By the 1870s, a noted evangelist, David B. Updegraff, supported baptism and communion in Friends churches. His teachings were considered a near-scandal in Friends meetings throughout the world, and resulted in some yearly meetings agreeing to allow for freedom of conscience in those practices. Updegraff largely solidified the EFCER's participation in the Evangelical-Holiness camp.

Malone University
The Evangelical Friends Church - Eastern Region was heavily influenced by the leadership of J. Walter and Emma Malone. In 1892, they founded the Cleveland Bible Training Institute — now Malone University in Canton — to train pastors and missionaries. Walter became the first General Superintendent in 1889, although the title was not formalized until 1891. The first missionaries to come out of the school were Esther Baird and Delia Fistler, who served in India. In fact, the school (either officially or through its graduates) helped to sponsor eight other schools of higher education around the country and around the world.

Twentieth century
Into the twentieth century, EFCER expanded its churches, missions, leaders and prominence amongst evangelicals worldwide. Leaders and members of note include Everett L. Cattell (pastor, missionary, author, and college president), Walter Williams (pastor, missionary, and superintendent), Cliff Robinson (missionary, one-time song leader for Billy Graham and founder of the Presidential Prayer Breakfasts), and Charles DeVol (renowned botanist and missionary).

Today
The current mission of EFCER is to equip churches to make disciples.

Current leadership
Executive Director: Tom Crawford
Director of Leadership Development: David Mercadante
Director of Church Health and Finance & Administration: Ed Walsh
Director of Multiplication: Rusty Savage

References

External links
Evangelical Friends Church – Eastern Region (official website)
Evangelical Friends Mission

Religious organizations established in 1812
Quaker organizations based in the United States
Non-profit organizations based in Ohio
Canton, Ohio